Kallakuzhi is a neighbourhood of the city of Tiruchirappalli in Tamil Nadu, India. It is located in the heart of the city.

Neighbourhoods and suburbs of Tiruchirappalli